Coptops mourgliai is a species of beetle in the family Cerambycidae. It was described by Villiers in 1974. It is known from Comoros.

References

mourgliai
Beetles described in 1974